Tama Maru (Japanese: 多摩丸) was an auxiliary minesweeper of the Imperial Japanese Navy during World War II.

History
Tama Maru was laid down on 3 August 1938 at the shipyard of Mitsubishi Jukogyo Hikoshima Zosensho at the behest of shipping company, Sankyo Kaiun. She was launched on 28 February 1939 and completed 1 April 1939. On 12 September 1941, she was requisitioned by the Imperial Japanese Navy and converted to an auxiliary minesweeper under Reserve Lieutenant Funaki Takashi (船木隆). Funaki served until 19 May 1943 when he was replaced by Reserve Lieutenant Yoshino Teruhiko (吉野輝彦). On 20 May 1944, she was reclassified as a submarine chaser. In October 1944, Yoshino was replaced by Lieutenant Shinoo Matao (新野尾又雄). She was struck from the Navy list on 3 May 1947.

References

1939 ships
Ships built by Mitsubishi Heavy Industries
Maritime incidents in April 1945
Ships sunk by American submarines
World War II minesweepers of Japan
Mine warfare vessels of the Imperial Japanese Navy
Auxiliary ships of the Imperial Japanese Navy